"Sola" is a song by former Puerto Rican rapper Héctor el Father taken from his first solo album The Bad Boy (2006). It was released alongside the album as its lead single on November 21, 2006 by VI Music, Machete Music and Gold Star Music. It is Héctor el Father's most successful single to date, reaching number one on the Billboard Hot Latin Songs chart and being nominated for various music awards. The song was later included on the track lists of the compilation albums El Rompe Discoteka: The Mix Album (2007) and The Bad Boy: The Most Wanted Edition (2007). The song was also included on the live album Bad Boy: The Concert (2007).

Charts

Awards and nominations

References

2006 singles
Héctor el Father songs